Rashad Floyd (born April 7, 1979) is a former American football defensive back for the Colorado Crush of the Arena Football League. He played college football at Portland State.

Floyd has also played for the Orlando Predators.

External links
Colorado Crush bio

1979 births
Living people
American football cornerbacks
American football safeties
Portland State Vikings football players
Orlando Predators players
Colorado Crush players